Kotla Sarang Khan is a village located in Kharian Tehsil, Gujrat District in Punjab Province of Pakistan.

The nearest town is Lalamusa about seven kilometers to the Northeast. The village has a population of almost ten thousand and holds two seats in the local area government union council. The main occupation is farming.

History
Most popular traditions hold that the first native of the village was a person named as Sarang Khan who settled in the area in the sixteenth century during the famous Band-O-Bast by Mughal Emperor Akbar. The population has increased very slowly. After the Afghan war some Afghan immigrants chose to remain in the village and few of them are still living with their families in neighborhoods.

Basic amenities
Electricity and telephone service are now provided to this remote village after long effort by village residents. Broadband facility is also available to residents. People with no land-line access in remote places can obtain high-speed internet through PTCL's wireless 3G service "EVO".

The nearest health center is Rural Health Centre about 3 miles away.

Education
Kotla has middle schools for boys and girls. The nearest high school is in Lalamusa.

References 

Populated places in Gujrat District